Estádio Anilado, usually known simply as Anilado is a football stadium located in Nossa Senhora Aparecida neighborhood, Francisco Beltrão, Paraná state, Brazil. The stadium has a maximum capacity of 7,000 people.

Estádio Anilado is owned by Clube Esportivo União, but from 2005 to 2008 it is being administered by the Francisco Beltrão City Hall . The stadium is the home ground of Francisco Beltrão Futebol Clube. Its name means indigo in Portuguese language.

History

In 1993, the works on Estádio Anilado were completed. The inaugural match was played on February 7 of that year, when Francisco Beltrão  and Goioerê drew 1-1.

The stadium's attendance record currently stands at 6,366, set on February 28, 1993, when Francisco Beltrão and Coritiba drew 1-1.

References
 União cede Anilado ao município até 2008 - Jornal de Beltrão (August 19, 2005)

External links
Templos do Futebol

Anilado
Sports venues in Paraná (state)
Francisco Beltrão